Noyuri Otsuka (1924 - 31 December 2019) was a Japanese Christian scholar and researcher.

Biography 
Otsuka was born in Tokyo in 1924. Her father, Tomiyoshi Otsuka, was a pastor and the founder of the Apostolic Church. Otsuka graduated from Tokyo Woman's Christian University, and also studied at Waseda University and Clark University in the United States. She held a research position at Yale University after graduating. Otsuka spent most of her career as a professor at Keisen University.

In 2004, she received an award of merit from the Japan Christian Cultural Association.

References 

1924 births
2019 deaths
Japanese educators
Japanese Christians
Waseda University alumni
Tokyo Woman's Christian University alumni
Clark University alumni
Academic staff of Keisen University
People from Tokyo